Below is a list of the names of the LGBT persons who have served on the highest court of a state or territory in the United States.

The first state with an LGBT justice was Oregon, where Rives Kistler was named to the bench in 2003. The first U.S. territory with an LGBT justice was Guam, where Benjamin Cruz was appointed in 1997. , there are 12 LGBT state supreme court justices, serving in 10 states.

In U.S. states

Current

Former

In U.S. territories

See also
State supreme courts
List of LGBT jurists in the United States
List of the first LGBT holders of political offices in the United States

Other topics of interest

 List of African-American jurists
 List of Asian American jurists
 List of Hispanic/Latino American jurists
 List of Jewish American jurists
 List of Native American jurists
 List of first women lawyers and judges in the United States
 List of first minority male lawyers and judges in the United States

References

 
 LGBT
Lists of American LGBT people